Fraternal correction (correctio fraterna) is the admonishing of one's neighbor by a private individual with the purpose of reforming him or, if possible, preventing his sinful indulgence.

This is distinct from an official disciplining, whose mouthpiece is a judge or other like superior, whose object is the punishment of one found to be guilty, and whose motive is not so directly the individual advantage of the offender as the furtherance of the common good.

In Roman Catholic ethics, this is, upon occasion and with due regard to circumstances, an obligation.  This is a conclusion not only deducible from the natural law binding us to love and to assist one another, but also explicitly contained in positive precept: "If thy brother shall offend against thee, go, and rebuke him between thee and him alone. If he shall hear thee, thou shalt gain thy brother" (Matthew 18:15). Given a sufficiently grave condition of spiritual distress calling for succour in this way, this commandment may exact fulfilment under pain of mortal sin.

The obligation of fraternal correction, so far as private persons go, does not obtain, generally speaking, for the case of one who violates a law through invincible ignorance.

Normally, the duty calls for the reproof to be administered privately. This is plainly the method appointed by Christ in the words just cited and only as a remedy for obduracy is any other contemplated by Him. Still there are occasions upon which one might lawfully proceed in a different way. For instance

 when the offence is a public one;
 when it makes for the prejudice of a third party or perhaps even the entire community;
 when it can only be condignly dealt with by the authority of a superior paternally exercised;
 when a public rebuke is necessary to preclude scandal
 when the offender has already in advance relinquished whatever right he possessed to have his good name safeguarded, as is the custom in some religious bodies.

External links

Catholic Encyclopedia "Fraternal correction"
 

Christian ethics